The 2007 A-League Pre-Season Challenge Cup competition was held in July and August in the lead-up to the start of the A-League 2007-08 season.  The opening round started on 14 July 2007.  The competition featured a group stage, with three regular rounds, followed by a two-week finals playoff.

In previous years, the Pre-Season Cup was used to enhance the A-League's profiles by playing pre-season games in regional centres. In 2007 venues included Sunshine Coast, Launceston, Canberra, Port Macquarie, Darwin, Orange and Geelong.

The group stage had a bonus point system. One point was awarded for 2 goals in a match, two points for 3 and three points for 4 or more goals in a match.

If two or more teams were level on points accumulated, the following criteria would be applied, in order, until one of the teams was determined as the higher ranked:
 highest goal difference;
 highest number of goals scored;
 result of the match played between the teams concerned;
 highest number of bonus points accumulated;
 lowest number of red cards accumulated;
 lowest number of yellow cards accumulated;
 toss of a coin.

The finals series was held over two weekends – 3 to 5 August, and 10 to 12 August.

Pre-Season Cup group stage fixtures and results

Round 1

Round 2

Round 3

Playoffs

Finals

Group A table

Group B table

Finals

Scorers
As at 12 August 2007
3 goals

 Cássio (Adelaide United)
 Bruce Djite (Adelaide United)
 Joel Griffiths (Newcastle Jets)
 Simon Lynch (Queensland Roar)
 Shane Smeltz (Wellington Phoenix)

2 goals

 Leo Bertos (Perth Glory)
 Jamie Harnwell (Perth Glory)
 Adam Kwasnik (Central Coast Mariners)
 Ante Milicic (Queensland Roar)
 Nikita Rukavytsya (Perth Glory)

1 goal

 Richie Alagich (Adelaide United)
 Danny Allsopp (Melbourne Victory)
 Nigel Boogaard (Central Coast Mariners)
 Alex Brosque (Sydney FC)
 Nathan Burns (Adelaide United)
 Daniel (Wellington Phoenix)
 Mate Dragičević (Perth Glory)
 Travis Dodd (Adelaide United)
 Andre Gumprecht (Central Coast Mariners)
 Carlos Hernandez (Melbourne Victory)
 Marcinho (Queensland Roar)
 Nick Mrdja (Central Coast Mariners)
 Sasa Ognenovski (Queensland Roar)
 Steven Old (Wellington Phoenix)
 Matthew Osman (Central Coast Mariners)
 Sasho Petrovski (Central Coast Mariners)
 Bobby Petta (Adelaide United)
 Reinaldo (Queensland Roar)
 Kristian Sarkies (Adelaide United)
 Matt Simon (Central Coast Mariners)
 Ufuk Talay (Sydney FC)
 David Tarka (Perth Glory)
 Scott Tunbridge (Newcastle Jets)
 Jobe Wheelhouse (Newcastle Jets)
 Alex Wilkinson (Central Coast Mariners)
 Ruben Zadkovich (Sydney FC)

Own goals
 Karl Dodd (Wellington Phoenix) for (Melbourne Victory)
 Mark Rudan (Sydney FC) for (Wellington Phoenix)

References

A-League Pre-Season Challenge Cup
Challenge Cup, 2007